Arbaaz is a given name. Notable people with the name include:

 Arbaaz Ali Khan, Pakistani actor
 Arbaaz Khan (born 1967), Indian actor, director, and film producer
 Arbaaz Mir, character from Assassin's Creed Chronicles: India

See also
 Arbaz, municipality in Switzerland